The Africa Volleyball Championship for Clubs Winner's Cup was an annual international club volleyball competition run by the African Volleyball Confederation. The cup winners from Africa's national volleyball leagues were invited to participate in this competition.

Summary

By club

 A round-robin tournament determined the final standings.

See also
 African Clubs Championship (volleyball)

References

African Volleyball Championships